Centurion University of Technology and Management, Andhra Pradesh (CUTM AP) is a private university located at Tekkali Village in Nellimarla mandal, Vizianagaram district, Andhra Pradesh, India. The university was established in 2017 by the Centurion School of Rural Enterprise Management Trust (CSREM Trust) through the Andhra Pradesh Private Universities (Establishment and Regulation) Act, 2016. It offers various diploma, undergraduate and postgraduate courses, as well as a Ph.D program. The university started operation in July 2017 from a temporary campus near Anandapuram and have a permanent campus near Vizianagaram in the future. It is a sister university of Centurion University of Technology and Management in Odisha.

Academics
The institute offers diploma, undergraduate and postgraduate courses through three schools:
 School of Engineering and Technology
 School of Management
 School of Vocational Training

It also offers a Ph.D program and work integrated courses.

References

External links

Visakhapatnam district
Universities in Andhra Pradesh
Educational institutions established in 2017
2017 establishments in Andhra Pradesh
Private universities in India